Cricket Russia (formerly United Cricket League)  is the official governing body of the sport of cricket in Russia. Its current headquarters is in Moscow, Russia.

In July 2019, Russia's Ministry of Sport refused to recognise cricket as a sport. The sport could still be played in the country, but it was not eligible for any support from the Ministry. However, in May 2020, the Russian Government reversed its decision, recognising cricket as a sport, and therefore eligible for funding.

References

External links
 Official website
 Official news website
 Official club and tournaments website
 Russia Beyond article from 2014

Sports organizations established in 2004
Cricket
Russia
Russia in international cricket